Ardita Sinani (born 15 November 1980) is a politician in southern Serbia and is an elected representative of the ethnic Albanian community. She is currently the mayor of the predominantly Albanian town of Preševo in southern Serbia. She succeeded Shqiprim Arifi in a new coalition arrangement in the 2021 Serbian local elections.

Political positions 
Ardita Sinani supports the inclusion of the future status of the Albanians in the Preševo valley in the negotiations between Kosovo and Serbia. She has openly proposed that the valley should get the same status as North Kosovo or obtain autonomy or become part of Kosovo.

References

1980 births
Living people